Bala Mahalleh-ye Narakeh (also Romanized as Bālā Maḩalleh-ye Narakeh; also known as Bālāmaḩalleh-ye Narkeh) is a village in Amlash-e Jonubi Rural District, in the Central District of Amlash County, Gilan Province, Iran. At the 2006 census, its population was 325, in 92 families.

References 

Populated places in Amlash County